Héda Frost (born 15 September 1936) is a French former freestyle swimmer. She competed at the 1956 Summer Olympics and the 1960 Summer Olympics.

References

External links
 

1936 births
Living people
French female freestyle swimmers
Olympic swimmers of France
Swimmers at the 1956 Summer Olympics
Swimmers at the 1960 Summer Olympics
Sportspeople from Algiers